Dorota Jędrusińska, née Dydo (born February 4, 1982 in Mielec) is a track and field sprint athlete who competes internationally for Poland. She is married to a fellow Polish sprinter Marcin Jędrusiński.

Jędrusińska represented Poland at the 2008 Summer Olympics in Beijing. She competed at the 4x100 metres relay together with Daria Korczyńska, Ewelina Klocek and Marta Jeschke. In their first round heat they placed fifth behind Belgium, Great Britain, Brazil, and Nigeria. Their time of 43.47 seconds was the second best non-directly qualifying time and the seventh time overall out of sixteen participating nations. With this result they qualified for the final in which they replaced Jeschke with Joanna Henryka Kocielnik. In the final they were eventually disqualified.

Major competitions record

References
 

1982 births
Living people
Polish female sprinters
Olympic athletes of Poland
Athletes (track and field) at the 2008 Summer Olympics
Universiade medalists in athletics (track and field)
People from Mielec
Sportspeople from Podkarpackie Voivodeship
Universiade bronze medalists for Poland
Medalists at the 2009 Summer Universiade
Olympic female sprinters